Sang Bast (also known as Sang Dasht) is a village in Sang Bast Rural District, in the Central District of Fariman County, Razavi Khorasan Province, Iran. At the 2006 census, its population was 670, in 187 families.

References 

Populated places in Fariman County